Puaneswaran a/l Gunasekaran (born 27 May 1983 in Selangor) is a Malaysian footballer who plays and for Malaysia M3 League club Ultimate F.C. Puaneswaran plays mainly as a right winger but can also plays as a right back.

Club career 
Puaneswaran played for Pos Malaysia FC from 2009, and helped the team win the 2009 Malaysia FAM League and promotion to 2010 Malaysia Premier League. He scored 19 goals in 2010, one less between the Golden Boot winner Zamri Hassan. Puaneswaran played with the team until 2012, sometimes as skipper of the team, as Pos Malaysia FC consolidated their place in the Premier League.
For the 2013 season,  Puaneswaran joined Terengganu FA.

Career statistics

Club

Honours
Melaka United
 Malaysia Premier League: 2016

References

External links 
 G.Puaneswaran Profile

1983 births
Malaysian sportspeople of Indian descent
Malaysian people of Tamil descent
Living people
Malaysian footballers
Terengganu FC players
Negeri Sembilan FA players
Sportspeople from Kuala Lumpur
Melaka United F.C. players
Association football defenders
Association football midfielders